DYRI (774 AM) RMN Iloilo is a radio station owned and operated by the Radio Mindanao Network. Its studio is located at the St. Anne Bldg., Luna St., La Paz, Iloilo City, and its transmitter is located along Coastal Rd., Brgy. Hinactacan, La Paz, Iloilo City. Established in 1960, DYRI is the pioneer station in the city and since 2019, the only station in the market operating 24 hours a day.

References

External links
Website 1
Website 2

Radio stations established in 1960
Radio stations in Iloilo City
News and talk radio stations in the Philippines